Pot Stand is a South Korean variety show which first ran on June 6, 2017 on KBS2 at 11:10 PM KST. It is a real variety show wherein guests publish their own books, recording the events of their daily lives to share them with others.

Hosts

List of episodes and guests 
In the ratings below, the highest rating for the show will be in red, and the lowest rating for the show will be in blue episode.

References

External links
 

Korean Broadcasting System original programming
South Korean variety television shows
2017 South Korean television series debuts
Korean-language television shows
2017 South Korean television series endings